Jeremiah O'Connor is the name of:

Jeremiah O'Connor (Jesuit), President of Boston College
Jeremiah F. O'Connor, politician who served in the New Jersey State Senate